Khorram Dasht Rural District may refer to:
 Khorram Dasht Rural District (Hamadan Province)
 Khorram Dasht Rural District (Isfahan Province)
 Khorram Dasht Rural District (Markazi Province)